Valérie Lacroute (born 29 October 1965) is a French politician who represented Seine-et-Marne's 2nd constituency in the National Assembly of France from 2012 to 2020. She left Parliament in 2020 due to an accumulation of mandates and was replaced by her substitute Sylvie Bouchet Bellecourt.

References

External links 

 National Assembly biography

1965 births
Living people
Deputies of the 14th National Assembly of the French Fifth Republic
Deputies of the 15th National Assembly of the French Fifth Republic
Members of the Regional Council of Île-de-France
Women mayors of places in France
Women members of the National Assembly (France)
The Republicans (France) politicians
21st-century French women politicians
Politicians from Île-de-France
People from Chalon-sur-Saône